Babylonian mathematics (also known as Assyro-Babylonian mathematics) are the mathematics developed or practiced by the people of Mesopotamia, from the days of the early Sumerians to the centuries following the fall of Babylon in 539 BC. Babylonian mathematical texts are plentiful and well edited. With respect to time they fall in two distinct groups: one from the Old Babylonian period (1830–1531 BC), the other mainly Seleucid from the last three or four centuries BC. With respect to content, there is scarcely any difference between the two groups of texts. Babylonian mathematics remained constant, in character and content, for nearly two millennia.

In contrast to the scarcity of sources in Egyptian mathematics, knowledge of Babylonian mathematics is derived from some 400 clay tablets unearthed since the 1850s. Written in Cuneiform script, tablets were inscribed while the clay was moist, and baked hard in an oven or by the heat of the sun. The majority of recovered clay tablets date from 1800 to 1600 BC, and cover topics that include fractions, algebra, quadratic and cubic equations and the Pythagorean theorem. The Babylonian tablet YBC 7289 gives an approximation to  accurate to three significant sexagesimal digits (about six significant decimal digits).

Origins of Babylonian mathematics
Babylonian mathematics is a range of numeric and more advanced mathematical practices in the ancient Near East, written in cuneiform script. Study has historically focused on the Old Babylonian period in the early second millennium BC due to the wealth of data available. There has been debate over the earliest appearance of Babylonian mathematics, with historians suggesting a range of dates between the 5th and 3rd millennia BC. Babylonian mathematics was primarily written on clay tablets in cuneiform script in the Akkadian or Sumerian languages.

"Babylonian mathematics" is perhaps an unhelpful term since the earliest suggested origins date to the use of accounting devices, such as bullae and tokens, in the 5th millennium BC.

Babylonian numerals

The Babylonian system of mathematics was a sexagesimal (base 60) numeral system. From this we derive the modern-day usage of 60 seconds in a minute, 60 minutes in an hour, and 360 degrees in a circle. The Babylonians were able to make great advances in mathematics for two reasons. Firstly, the number 60 is a superior highly composite number, having factors of 1, 2, 3, 4, 5, 6, 10, 12, 15, 20, 30, 60 (including those that are themselves composite), facilitating calculations with fractions. Additionally, unlike the Egyptians and Romans, the Babylonians had a true place-value system, where digits written in the left column represented larger values (much as, in our base ten system, 734 = 7×100 + 3×10 + 4×1).

Sumerian mathematics
The ancient Sumerians of Mesopotamia developed a complex system of metrology from 3000 BC. From 2600 BC onwards, the Sumerians wrote multiplication tables on clay tablets and dealt with geometrical exercises and division problems. The earliest traces of the Babylonian numerals also date back to this period.

Old Babylonian mathematics (2000–1600 BC)
Most clay tablets that describe Babylonian mathematics belong to the Old Babylonian, which is why the mathematics of Mesopotamia is commonly known as Babylonian mathematics. Some clay tablets contain mathematical lists and tables, others contain problems and worked solutions.

Arithmetic
The Babylonians used pre-calculated tables to assist with arithmetic. For example, two tablets found at Senkerah on the Euphrates in 1854, dating from 2000 BC, give lists of the squares of numbers up to 59 and the cubes of numbers up to 32. The Babylonians used the lists of squares together with the formulae:

to simplify multiplication.

The Babylonians did not have an algorithm for long division. Instead they based their method on the fact that:

together with a table of reciprocals. Numbers whose only prime factors are 2, 3 or 5 (known as 5-smooth or regular numbers) have finite reciprocals in sexagesimal notation, and tables with extensive lists of these reciprocals have been found.

Reciprocals such as 1/7, 1/11, 1/13, etc. do not have finite representations in sexagesimal notation. To compute 1/13 or to divide a number by 13 the Babylonians would use an approximation such as:

Algebra

As well as arithmetical calculations, Babylonian mathematicians also developed algebraic methods of solving equations. Once again, these were based on pre-calculated tables.

To solve a quadratic equation, the Babylonians essentially used the standard quadratic formula. They considered quadratic equations of the form:

where b and c were not necessarily integers, but c was always positive. They knew that a solution to this form of equation is:

and they found square roots efficiently using division and averaging. They always used the positive root because this made sense when solving "real" problems. Problems of this type included finding the dimensions of a rectangle given its area and the amount by which the length exceeds the width.

Tables of values of n3 + n2 were used to solve certain cubic equations. For example, consider the equation:

Multiplying the equation by a2 and dividing by b3 gives:

Substituting y = ax/b gives:

which could now be solved by looking up the n3 + n2 table to find the value closest to the right-hand side. The Babylonians accomplished this without algebraic notation, showing a remarkable depth of understanding. However, they did not have a method for solving the general cubic equation.

Growth
Babylonians modeled exponential growth, constrained growth (via a form of sigmoid functions), and doubling time, the latter in the context of interest on loans.

Clay tablets from c. 2000 BC include the exercise "Given an interest rate of 1/60 per month (no compounding), compute the doubling time." This yields an annual interest rate of 12/60 = 20%, and hence a doubling time of 100% growth/20% growth per year = 5 years.

Plimpton 322

The Plimpton 322 tablet contains a list of "Pythagorean triples", i.e., integers  such that .
The triples are too many and too large to have been obtained by brute force.

Much has been written on the subject, including some speculation (perhaps anachronistic) as to whether the tablet could have served as an early trigonometrical table. Care must be exercised to see the tablet in terms of methods familiar or accessible to scribes at the time.
[...] the question "how was the tablet calculated?" does not have to have the
same answer as the question "what problems does the tablet set?" The first can be answered
most satisfactorily by reciprocal pairs, as first suggested half a century ago, and the second
by some sort of right-triangle problems.
(E. Robson, "Neither Sherlock Holmes nor Babylon: a reassessment of Plimpton 322", Historia Math. 28 (3), p. 202).

Geometry
Babylonians knew the common rules for measuring volumes and areas. They measured the circumference of a circle as three times the diameter and the area as one-twelfth the square of the circumference, which would be correct if  is estimated as 3.
The volume of a cylinder was taken as the product of the base and the height, however, the volume of the frustum of a cone or a square pyramid was incorrectly taken as the product of the height and half the sum of the bases. The Pythagorean rule was also known to the Babylonians.

The "Babylonian mile" was a measure of distance equal to about 11.3 km (or about seven modern miles).
This measurement for distances eventually was converted to a "time-mile" used for measuring the travel of the Sun, therefore, representing time.

The ancient Babylonians had known of formulas concerning the ratios of the sides of similar triangles for many centuries, but they lacked the concept of an angle measure and consequently, studied the sides of triangles instead.

The Babylonian astronomers kept detailed records of the rising and setting of stars, the motion of the planets, and the solar and lunar eclipses, all of which required familiarity with angular distances measured on the celestial sphere.

They also used a form of Fourier analysis to compute an ephemeris (table of astronomical positions), which was discovered in the 1950s by Otto Neugebauer. To make calculations of the movements of celestial bodies, the Babylonians used basic arithmetic and a coordinate system based on the ecliptic, the part of the heavens that the sun and planets travel through.

Tablets kept in the British Museum provide evidence that the Babylonians even went so far as to have a concept of objects in an abstract mathematical space. The tablets date from between 350 and 50 B.C.E., revealing that the Babylonians understood and used geometry even earlier than previously thought. The Babylonians used a method for estimating the area under a curve by drawing a trapezoid underneath, a technique previously believed to have originated in 14th century Europe. This method of estimation allowed them to, for example, find the distance Jupiter had traveled in a certain amount of time.

See also

 Babylonia
 Babylonian astronomy
 History of mathematics
 Islamic mathematics for mathematics in Islamic Iraq/Mesopotamia

Notes

References

 (1991 pbk ed. ).

 
Mathematics of ancient history